Jürgen Walther Ludwig Aschoff (January 25, 1913 – October 12, 1998) was a German physician, biologist and behavioral physiologist. Together with Erwin Bünning and Colin Pittendrigh, he is considered to be a co-founder of the field of chronobiology.

Aschoff's work in the field of chronobiology introduced the idea that shifting one's light-dark cycle can result in harmful effects, such as correlations with mental illness.

Life
Aschoff was born in Freiburg Im Breisgau as the fifth child of the pathologist Ludwig Aschoff (known for discovering the Aschoff-Tawara or atrioventricular node) and his wife Clara. He grew up in the liberal but morally strict world of Prussian academia. After the Abitur at a humanistic high school, he – according to his own statement "lacking a specific interest" – studied medicine at the University of Bonn, where he joined the Burschenschaft (fraternity) Alemannia Bonn. Aschoff’s scientific career began in 1938, when he moved to the University of Göttingen to study thermoregulation physiology with Hermann Rein. In 1944, he received the venia legendi. He then became a professor at the University of Göttingen in 1949.

In 1952, his mentor, Hermann Rein, was appointed director of the Max Planck Institute for Medical Research in Heidelberg. Rein brought Aschoff to the Institute as a collaborator to study circadian rhythms in humans, birds, and mice.  Aschoff then moved to the Max Planck Institute for Behavioral Physiology in Andechs to work with Gustav Kramer, who showed time-compensated sun-compass navigation in birds, and Erich von Holst, who studied physiological oscillators. From 1967 to 1979, he was a director at the Max Planck Institute for Behavioral Physiology and an extraordinary professor in Munich. Aschoff was a scientific member and a member of the Kollegiums of the Max Planck Institute for Behavior Physiology, as well as senator of the Max Planck Society from 1972 to 1976.

Aschoff was known as an excellent lecturer with a booming voice, and he took a special interest in creating a scientific community and encouraging young scientists.   After his retirement in 1983 and return to Freiburg, Aschoff continued his scientific work in the form of further publications. Only the death of his wife Hilde broke his unusual vitality. Jürgen Aschoff died ten months after his wife in 1998, after a short illness at the age of 85 years.

Work
Aschoff provided a strong foundation for the field of chronobiology through his research on circadian rhythms and entrainment in many different organisms such as rats, mice, birds, macaques, monkeys, and humans. His early research focused on understanding the properties of circadian rhythms and how these rhythms can change in response to stimuli. His later work was more applicable to pathologies, such as psychiatric disorders and dangers of shift work schedules, which can result from manipulating specific Zeitgebers. Aschoff's work in the field of chronobiology introduced the idea that shifting one's light-dark cycle can result in harmful effects, such as correlations with mental illness.

Early work
Aschoff began his research on the physiology of thermoregulation by self-experimentation. He discovered that there was a 24-hour rhythm of variation in body temperature. After these experiments, he began investigating the basic mechanisms of circadian rhythm. In the 1950s, he met and began to collaborate with Erwin Bünning and Colin Pittendrigh. Aschoff began further experimentation studying the circadian rhythms of birds and mice under constant conditions. His results led to the conclusion that circadian oscillations of biological processes were innate and did not require prior exposure to a 24-hour day to be expressed.

Aschoff also applied these methods to experiments with human circadian rhythms by building an underground "bunker" to isolate human subjects from any external environmental cues. Subjects placed in this bunker were allowed to turn lights on or off according to their own internal rhythms. After over twenty years of tracking sleep-wake cycles, body temperature, urine output, and other physiological and behavioral outputs, Aschoff and his collaborator Rütger Wever concluded that humans have endogenous circadian oscillators. This discovery has become the foundation for our understanding of many medical problems such as aging, sleep disorders, and jet lag.

In 1960, Aschoff coined the term Zeitgeber (from German for "time giver" or "synchronizer") to refer to external, environmental cues that synchronize an endogenous oscillator to the environmental cycle. To investigate the properties of natural endogenous oscillators, Aschoff exposed organisms to constant conditions without Zeitgeber cues (either constant light or constant darkness). The observations from this paper were formulated into the fundamental rules of biological clocks.

Aschoff's Rule
From the experiments communicated in 1960, Aschoff noted that under constant light conditions, the activity phase shortens in nocturnal organisms and lengthens in diurnal organisms. These trends were termed alpha compression and alpha expansion, respectively. In tribute to his mentor, Pittendrigh called this observation "Aschoff's Rule" in a 1960 publication, and the designation remains today.

Aschoff's rule is related to the model of parametric entrainment, which assumes continuous phase changes.  Aschoff and Pittendrigh approached the field with different models of how oscillators entrain, which resulted in different predictive models. Aschoff's parametric model states that entrainment occurs through gradual changes in the clock that adapt to a new light-dark cycle. Although this is no longer recognized as the correct model in the field, Serge Daan suggested in 1998 that Aschoff made qualitative contributions that provide valuable alternatives to inconsistencies in the current field.

Later work
Much of Aschoff's later work involved tests on human subjects. He found that the absence of a light-dark cycle does not prevent humans from entrainment. Rather, knowing the time of day from social cues, such as regular meal times, is sufficient for entrainment. 
Aschoff also found that different circadian outputs such as body temperature and locomotor activity can be either internally synchronized or desynchronized depending on the strength of the Zeitgeber. In constant darkness, rectal temperature and sleep onset and duration became desynchronized in some subjects, and the rectal temperature at the time of sleep onset was correlated to the duration of the bout of sleep. He hypothesized that internal desynchronization, the phase differences resulting from period differences between two circadian output processes, could be related to many psychiatric disorders.

Some of Aschoff's later work also integrated his initial interest in thermoregulation with his work on circadian rhythm. He found a circadian rhythm in thermal conductance, a measurement of heat transfer from the body. Minimal conductance in mammals and birds oscillates with circadian phase, with a wide range of conductance values. This allows animals to release heat during their activity period, when they have higher basal metabolism, as well as conserve heat during their rest period, when they have lower basal metabolism. In birds, the circadian rhythm in conductance results mostly from circadian rates of evaporative heat loss. In mammals, the conductance oscillates with circadian rhythms in the body's heat resistance and blood flow rate.

Following up on his temperature studies, he found that a mammalian species can entrain to a temperature cycle, but that temperature is a weak Zeitgeber compared to a light-dark cycle.

Aschoff described masking signals as inputs that circumvent the pacemaker but nevertheless lead to modulation of a circadian behavior that is also controlled by the pacemaker. Parametric entrainment is entrainment that does not result from an instant change in phase, as governed by a Phase Response Curve, as in the case of masking signals. The term Aschoff used for this phenomenon is “arousal” due to non-photic zeitgebers. Data from experimental assays show a relationship between masking effects and phase, leading to a “demasking” effect whereby animals arrhythmic in constant conditions have free-running periods in high frequency light-dark cycles. Aschoff concluded that the oscillator or circadian clock “integrates” over the intensity of light to which it has been exposed, and then responds with a change in the period of activity, as seen in greenfinches, chaffinches, hamsters, and siskins.  Aschoff concluded, however, that non-parametric effects, as opposed to parametric effects, are the principal source of entrainment.

Aschoff–Wever Model
1) An increase in the duration of sunset advances the phase of an organism for nocturnal and diurnal animals.

2) An increase in strength of the zeitgeber should increase as sunset duration increases.

Influence on other researchers
Aschoff has published articles with both Pittendrigh and Serge Daan, the latter also a pivotal researcher in chronobiology. In his recent work, Daan has attempted to reconcile the idea of parametric entrainment to light proposed by Aschoff with the non-parametric model of entrainment proposed by Pittendrigh, and results from a 2008 paper from Daan's lab lend further evidence to Aschoff's model of parametric entrainment.

Although Aschoff’s collaboration with Gustav Kramer was never fully realized due to the latter’s sudden death, Aschoff continued to use birds as model organisms and work with ornithologists.

Aschoff's Rule (prize)
At a dinner held in Aschoff's honor at the 1991 Gordon Conference on Chronobiology, Professor Till Roenneberg initiated the annual giving of the Aschoff's Rule prize to scientists who have advanced the field of chronobiology by presenting a plaque with a ruler on it to Professor Maroli K. Chandrashekera. Recipients choose the winner the following year and must follow two guidelines:
 The successor should be a chronobiologist working in a country different from the one of the current holder of the prize.
 The successor should be working with an organism different from the one of the current holder of the prize.

Selected publications
Exogenous and Endogenous Components in Circadian Rhythms (1960),
Beginn und Ende der täglichen Aktivität freilebender Vögel (with R. Wever, 1962),
Circadian Clocks (1965) *Desynchronization and Resynchronization of Human Circadian Rhythm (1969)
Aschoff, J. (1965) Circadian Rhythms in Man. Science. 148: 1427–1432.

References

1913 births
1998 deaths
Scientists from Freiburg im Breisgau
People from the Grand Duchy of Baden
20th-century German biologists
Chronobiologists
University of Bonn alumni